Bull is an American drama series created by Michael S. Chernuchin that aired on TNT from August 15, 2000, to January 31, 2001.  The show's name is in reference to the bull market, but the airing of the series coincided with the dot-com bubble crash that turned what had until then been a bull economy in the United States into a bear market. In February 2001 the series was cancelled after airing 12 of the planned 20 episodes.

Synopsis
Bull is about a group of Wall Street investment bankers who risk everything to break away from an established firm and start their own company. Leading the way is Robert "Ditto" Roberts III, the brilliant grandson of the founder of their former company who must betray his family heritage in order to stake a claim to his own life. His partners—Corey Granville, Marty Decker, Carson Boyd, Alison Jeffers and Marissa Rufo—each with a separate agenda, risk losing everything to join him in the new rival start-up firm that will answer the call of the new economy. With no financing, no clients and the rivalry of every player in town, the team's dreams rest on Hunter Lasky, the hard-hitting negotiations shark who has the potential to give the renegade team of Wall Street brokers the edge and legitimacy they need to succeed in the competitive world of high finance.

Cast

Main
 Alicia Coppola as Marissa Rufo 
 Ian Kahn as Marty Decker 
 Donald Moffat as Robert Roberts 
 George Newbern as Robert Roberts III
 Ryan O'Neal as Robert Roberts II
 Elisabeth Röhm as Alison Jeffers
 Stanley Tucci as Hunter Lasky
 Christopher Wiehl as Carson Boyd 
 Malik Yoba as Corey Granville

Recurring
 Frederick Koehler as Joey Rutigliano
Nina Foch as Madeline Roberts

Episodes

Production
Michael S. Chernuchin was the series creator, executive producer and show runner. Eric Laneuville and Ken Horton were also executive producers for the series. Doug Palau was a supervising producer and writer. Palau had previously worked with Chernuchin on Brooklyn South.

References

External links 
 
 

2000s American workplace drama television series
2000 American television series debuts
2000 American television series endings
Television shows set in New York City
TNT (American TV network) original programming
English-language television shows
Television series by Warner Bros. Television Studios